

Predicted and Scheduled Events

March 
 9- Storm hits UAE, cutting power and closing schools in Abu Dhabi and early dismissal in Dubai.

August
August 5-21 - 2 athletes from the United Arab Emirates will compete at the 2016 Summer Olympics in Rio de Janeiro, Brazil

 
2010s in the United Arab Emirates
Years of the 21st century in the United Arab Emirates
United Arab Emirates
United Arab Emirates